Martinus "Martin" Venix (born 4 March 1950) is a retired cyclist from the Netherlands. After winning a silver medal at the Amateur UCI Motor-paced World Championships in 1974 he turned professional, winning the UCI World Championships in 1979 and 1982 and finishing in second place in 1978.

References

1950 births
Living people
Dutch male cyclists
Sportspeople from Tilburg
UCI Track Cycling World Champions (men)
Dutch track cyclists
Cyclists from North Brabant
20th-century Dutch people
21st-century Dutch people